Kouka (also, Kuko, Kouko, and Kouba) is a town located in the province of Banwa in Burkina Faso.

References

Populated places in the Boucle du Mouhoun Region
Banwa Province